George J. Annas is the William Fairfield Warren Distinguished Professor and Director of the Center for Health Law, Ethics & Human Rights at the Boston University School of Public Health, School of Medicine, and School of Law.

Biography
Annas holds a bachelor's degree in economics from Harvard College, a J.D. from Harvard Law School and an M.P.H. from the Harvard School of Public Health, where he was a Joseph P. Kennedy Fellow in Medical Ethics.  He works the field of health law, bioethics, and human rights.

Annas is the cofounder of Global Lawyers and Physicians, a transnational professional NGO that states it is dedicated to promoting human rights and health. He teaches health law and human rights courses in the Boston University School of Public Health, the Boston University School of Law, and the Boston University School of Medicine. He is a Hastings Center fellow, a former member of the National Academy of Medicine, a fellow of the American Association for the Advancement of Sciences, and a member of the National Academies' Committee on Human Rights.

Selected bibliography

Books 
 
 
 
Book review:  
 
 
Book review:  Selected as second of the top ten humanitarian books of 1999.

Journal articles

See also 
 Bioethics
 Biopolitics
 Eugenics Wars argument
 Genism

References

External links
 George Annas and Wendy Mariner on  The Future of Health Law, on BUniverse, Boston University's video archive.
 Interview: Engineering Life from Wonderlance, a monthly digital magazine

Bioethicists
Harvard Law School alumni
Harvard School of Public Health alumni
Living people
Boston University School of Public Health faculty
Hastings Center Fellows
Year of birth missing (living people)
Harvard College alumni
Members of the National Academy of Medicine